The Nzi River or N'zi River is a river in Ivory Coast. It is a tributary of the Bandama River.

On 6 September 2016, the railway bridge over this river near Dimbokro collapsed.

References 

Rivers of Ivory Coast